Karađorđe's death is a 1983 Serbian history drama film, directed by Đorđe Kadijević. The film was written by Danko Popović.

Cast 
Aleksandar Berček : Miloš Obrenović
Marko Nikolić : Karađorđe
Pavle Vuisić : Vujica Vulićević
Miodrag Radovanović : Marashli Ali Pasha
Gorica Popović : Ljubica Obrenović
Bora Todorović : Naum

External links 
 

1983 films
Serbian war drama films
1980s war drama films
Films about assassinations
Serbian Revolution
Biographical films about Serbian royalty
1983 drama films
Cultural depictions of Karađorđe